In politics, a defector is a person who gives up allegiance to one state or political entity in exchange for allegiance to another.

Defector may also refer to:

Books
The Defector (Maron novel), 1986 German novel by Monika Maron
 The Defector (Silva novel), a 2009 novel by Daniel Silva

Film and TV
 The Defector (film), a 1966 film
 "The Defector" (Star Trek: The Next Generation), a 1990 episode of the television series Star Trek: The Next Generation
 Defectors (game show), a game show broadcast in the UK
 The Defector: Escape from North Korea, a 2013 documentary film directed by Ann Shin

Media
 Defector Media, a sports blog and media company

Music
 Defector (Steve Hackett album), 1980
 Defector (John Hermann album), 2003
 "Defector", a song by Muse from their 2015 album Drones
 The Defectors, a Danish rock band